This list of churches in Nidaros is a list of the Church of Norway churches in the Diocese of Nidaros which covers all of Trøndelag county in Norway. The list is divided into several sections, one for each deanery  in the diocese.

Administratively within each deanery, the churches are divided by municipalities which have their own church council  and then into parishes  which have their own councils . Each parish may have one or more congregations in it.  The municipality of Trondheim includes several deaneries within the municipality due to its large population.

Historically, the diocese has had many deaneries, but the number of deaneries has been reduced in recent years. In 1995, the old Sør-Fosen prosti was merged with Orkdal prosti and on the same date the old Nord-Fosen prosti was renamed simply Fosen prosti. On 1 July 2015, the Nærøy prosti, which included the municipalities of Leka, Vikna, and Nærøy, was merged with the Namdal prosti. On 1 January 2020, the old Nord-Innherad prosti and Sør-Innherad prosti were merged to form the new Stiklestad prosti.

Nidaros domprosti 
The Nidaros arch-deanery covers the urban city centre of the city of Trondheim, along the Trondheimsfjorden in Trondheim Municipality.  The Nidaros Cathedral is the seat of the Bishop of the Diocese of Nidaros as well as the Dean of the deanery.  This arch-deanery is divided into three parishes with a total of five churches.

Fosen prosti 
This deanery covers the Fosen peninsula in Trøndelag county.  The area lies between the Norwegian Sea and Trondheim Fjord. It includes the municipalities of Osen, Åfjord, Ørland, and Indre Fosen.  The deanery is divided up into 14 parishes.  The deanery is headquartered at Stadsbygd Church in the village of Stadsbygd in Indre Fosen Municipality.

Gauldal prosti 
This deanery covers the Gauldalen valley and surrounding areas in southern Trøndelag county.  It includes the municipalities of Holtålen, Melhus, Midtre Gauldal, Oppdal, Rennebu, and Røros.  The deanery is headquartered at Støren Church in the village of Støren in Midtre Gauldal municipality.

Heimdal og Byåsen prosti
This deanery covers the southern and western areas of Trondheim Municipality.  The deanery is divided up into eight parishes.  The deanery is headquartered at Heimdal Church in the village of Heimdal in Trondheim Municipality.  The deanery was established on 1 October 2017 when the old Byåsen deanery was merged with the Heimdal deanery.  The deanery includes nine parishes.

The old Byåsen deanery covered the western part of the city centre of Trondheim.  The Dean of the old deanery of Byåsen was headquartered at the Byåsen Church in the Byåsen area of Trondheim. Byåsen deanery was created in 2004 when the Byåsen and Sverresborg parishes from the Heimdal prosti and the Ilen parish from Nidaros domprosti were moved to the new deanery.

Namdal prosti 
This deanery covers the vast northern part of Trøndelag county, covering the municipalities of Lierne, Røyrvik, Namsskogan, Grong, Høylandet, Overhalla, Namsos, Flatanger, Nærøysund, and Leka.  Those municipalities are further divided up into 17 parishes.  The deanery is headquartered at Namsos Church in the town of Namsos in Namsos Municipality.

On 1 July 2015, the old Nærøy prosti (which included all the churches in Nærøy, Leka, and Vikna municipalities) was merged into Namdal prosti. On 1 January 2020, the churches in the old municipality of Namdalseid were moved to Namdal deanery when the municipality merged into Namsos.

Orkdal prosti 
This deanery covers the southwestern coastal part of Trøndelag county.  The deanery covers the municipalities of Frøya, Heim, Hitra, Orkland, Skaun, and Rindal.  The deanery is headquartered at Orkdal Church in the village of Fannrem in Orkland Municipality. In 2020, Rindal Municipality was moved to this deanery from the Diocese of Møre after the municipality changed counties in 2019.

Stiklestad prosti 
This deanery covers the Innherad district in central Trøndelag county. The deanery includes the municipalities of Snåsa, Steinkjer, Inderøy, Verdal, Levanger, and Frosta. The deanery is headquartered at Stiklestad Church in the village of Stiklestad in Verdal Municipality. The deanery was established on 1 January 2020 when the old Nord-Innherad and Sør-Innherad deaneries were merged.

The old Sør-Innherad deanery included Verdal, Levanger, and Frosta municipalities and Nord-Innherad deanery included Snåsa, Steinkjer, and Inderøy, Verran (now part of Steinkjer), and Namdalseid municipalities. Namdalseid was merged into Namsos and so it joined the Namdal prosti in 2020. Sør-Innherad deanery was based at Stiklestad, just like the new Stiklestad deanery. The old Nord-Innherad deanery was headquartered at Steinkjer Church in the town of Steinkjer in Steinkjer Municipality.

Stjørdal prosti 
This deanery covers the traditional district of Stjørdalen in eastern Trøndelag county.  The deanery includes the municipalities of Stjørdal, Meråker, Malvik, Selbu, and Tydal.  The deanery is headquartered at Værnes Church in the village of Prestmoen, just south of Stjørdalshalsen in Stjørdal municipality.

Strinda prosti 
This deanery covers the eastern part of the municipality of Trondheim; containing a total of five parishes. The deanery is headquartered at Strinda Church in the village of Strinda.

References

Nidaros